Louis Pierre Henri Jobier (6 July 1879 – 25 March 1930) was a French fencer. He won a gold medal in the foil competition at the 1924 Summer Olympics.

References

External links
 

1879 births
1930 deaths
French male foil fencers
Olympic fencers of France
Fencers at the 1900 Summer Olympics
Fencers at the 1924 Summer Olympics
Olympic gold medalists for France
Olympic medalists in fencing
Sportspeople from Yonne
Medalists at the 1924 Summer Olympics